This is a  list of baronies in Portugal:

 Baron of Água-Izé
 Baron of Aguiar
 Baron of Alagoa
 Baron of Albufeira
 Baron of Alcantarilha
 Baron of Alcobaça
 Baron of Alcochete
 Baron of Aldenberg
 Baron of Alenquer
 Baron of Almargem
 Baron of Almeda
 Baron of Almeida
 Baron of Almeida Santos
 Baron of Almeidinha
 Baron of Almeirim
 Baron of Almofala
 Baron of Alpendurada
 Baron of Alquerubim
 Baron of Alvaiázere
 Baron of Alverca
 Baron of Alves da Conceição
 Baron of Alvito
 Baron of Alvoco da Serra
 Baron of Ancede
 Baron of Andaluz
 Baron of Anciães
 Baron of Antas
 Baron of Aquino
 Baron of Arcossó
 Baron of Arede Coelho
 Baron of Areia Larga
 Baron of Areias de Cambra
 Baron of Argamassa
 Baron of Arruda
 Baron of Assunção
 Baron of A-Ver-o-Mar
 Baron of Balsemão
 Baron of Bamberg
 Baron of Barbosa Rodrigues
 Baron of Barcel
 Baron of Barcelinhos
 Baron of Barreto
 Baron of Barroil
 Baron of Barry
 Baron of Basto
 Baron of Bastos
 Baron of Beyet de Valmont
 Baron of Beduíno
 Baron of Belém
 Baron of Berger
 Baron of Bernardo Pinto
 Baron of Bernheim
 Baron of Bertelinho
 Baron of Bliss
 Baron of Bolhão
 Baron of Bonfim
 Baron of Brissos
 Baron of Burchardt
 Baron of Burgal
 Baron of Cabinda
 Baron of Cabo da Praia
 Baron of Cacela
 Baron of Cacilhas
 Baron of Cadoro
 Baron of Calapor
 Baron of Calvário
 Baron of Camocim
 Baron of Campanhã
 Baron of Campolide
 Baron of Candal
 Baron of Capelinha
 Baron of Caria
 Baron of Casais do Douro
 Baron of Casal
 Baron of Casalinho
 Baron of Castelo
 Baron of Castelo de Paiva
 Baron of Castelo Novo
 Baron of Castro Daire
 Baron of Castro Silveira
 Baron of Cercal
 Baron of Chanceleiros
 Baron of Claros
 Baron of Coche de La Ferté
 Baron of Colaço e Macnamara
 Baron of Combarjua
 Baron of Conceição
 Baron of Condeixa
 Baron of Corticeira
 Baron of Corvo
 Baron of Costa Noronha
 Baron of Costa Ricci
 Baron of Costa Veiga
 Baron of Costeado
 Baron of Costeira
 Baron of Cruzeiro
 Baron of Danvers
 Baron of Dempó
 Baron of Dinis Samuel
 Baron of Duparchy
 Baron of Eisemann
 Baron of Erlanger
 Baron of Ermida
 Baron of Esposende
 Baron of Estrela
 Baron of Estremoz
 Baron of Eugène Grosos
 Baron of Ezpeleta
 Baron of Famalicão
 Baron of Faria
 Baron of Faro
 Baron of Fermil
 Baron of Ferreira
 Baron of Ferreira dos Santos
 Baron of Folgosa
 Baron of Fonte Bela
 Baron of Fonte Boa
 Baron of Fonte do Mato
 Baron of Fonte Nova
 Baron of Fornelos
 Baron of Fornos de Algodres
 Baron of Forrester
 Baron of Forster
 Baron of Foz
 Baron of Fragosela
 Baron of Francos
 Baron of Frantzenstein
 Baron of Freitas Henriques
 Baron of Freixo
 Baron of Gabe de Massarelos
 Baron of Gáfete
 Baron of Gória
 Baron of Goiana
 Baron of Goldsmith da Palmeira
 Baron of Gondoriz
 Baron of Gouvinhas
 Baron of Gramosa
 Baron of Granjão
 Baron of Grimancelos
 Baron of Guadalupe
 Baron of Hortega
 Baron of Hospital
 Barão de Howorth de Sacavém
 Baron of Ilha Grande de Joanes
 Baron of Inhaca
 Baron of Itanhaém
 Baron of Jardim do Mar
 Baron of Joane
 Baron of Jozan
 Baron of Jugueiros
 Baron of Junqueira
 Baron of Kessler
 Baron of Knowles
 Baron of Koenigswarter
 Baron of Lages
 Baron of Lagoa
 Baron of Lagos
 Baron of Laguna
 Baron of Lamberg
 Baron of Laranjeiras
 Baron of Laranjeiras
 Baron of Lazarim
 Baron of Le Chin de Barlaimont
 Baron of Leiria
 Baron of Linhó
 Baron of Lobata
 Baron of Lopez de Torreguay
 Baron of Lordelo
 Baron of Louredo
 Baron of Lourenço Martins
 Baron of Luso
 Baron of Löwenstein
 Baron of Madalena
 Baron of Magalhães
 Baron of Magé
 Baron of Manique do Intendente
 Baron of Marinho
 Baron of Massarelos
 Baron of Mata Bacelar
 Baron of Matalha
 Baron of Matosinhos
 Baron of Matoso
 Baron of Maurício de Matias
 Baron of Maxial
 Baron of Mendonça
 Baron of Merk
 Baron of Mesquita
 Baron of Miranda do Corvo
 Baron of Mirandela
 Baron of Mogadouro
 Baron of Mogofores
 Baron of Moimenta da Beira
 Baron of Molelos
 Baron of Mondim
 Baron of Monte Brasil
 Baron of Monte Castedo
 Baron of Monte Córdova
 Baron of Monte Pedral
 Baron of Moreira
 Baron of Mossâmedes
 Baron of Nelas
 Baron of Nevogilde
 Baron of Nora
 Baron of Noronha
 Baron of Nossa Senhora da Luz
 Baron of Nossa Senhora da Oliveira
 Baron of Nossa Senhora da Saúde
 Baron of Nossa Senhora da Vitória na Batalha
 Baron of Nossa Senhora das Mercês
 Baron of Nova Sinta
 Baron of O'Fard de La Grange
 Baron of Oleiros
 Baron of Oliveira
 Baron of Oliveira Castro
 Baron of Oliveira do Conde
 Baron of Oliveira Lima
 Baron of Olocau
 Baron of Ornelas
 Baron of Ovar
 Baron of Paço da Figueira
 Baron of Paço de Couceiro
 Baron of Paço de Sousa
 Baron of Paçô Vieira
 Baron of Paiva
 Baron of Paiva Manso
 Baron of Palença
 Baron of Palma
 Baron of Palme
 Baron of Paranhos
 Baron of Patterson
 Baron of Paulo Cordeiro
 Baron of Paúlos
 Baron of Peixoto Serra
 Baron of Perafita
 Baron of Pereira Bastos
 Baron of Pereira da Mota
 Baron of Pereira Gonçalves
 Baron of Pereira Marinho
 Baron of Peres da Silva
 Baron of Perném
 Baron of Pernes
 Baron of Perquel
 Baron of Picard
 Baron of Pico do Celeiro
 Baron of Picoas
 Baron of Pomarão
 Baron of Pomarinho
 Baron of Pombalinho
 Baron of Pombeiro de Riba Vizela
 Baron of Ponte da Barca
 Baron of Ponte da Quarteira
 Baron of Ponte de Marxil
 Baron of Ponte de Santa Maria
 Baron of Portela
 Baron of Porto Covo da Bandeira
 Baron of Porto de Mós
 Baron of Póvoa de Santo Adrião
 Baron of Póvoa de Varzim
 Baron of Prime
 Baron of Proença-a-Velha
 Baron of Provezende
 Baron of Queluz
 Baron of Quinta da Costeira
 Baron of Quinta do Ferro
 Baron of Quintela
 Baron of Ramalde
 Baron of Ramalho
 Baron of Ramalho
 Baron of Real Agrado
 Baron of Reboredo
 Baron of Recardães
 Baron of Recosta
 Baron of Regaleira
 Baron of Rendufe
 Baron of Resende
 Baron of Resgate
 Baron of Retorta
 Baron of Riba Tâmega
 Baron of Ribeira de Pena
 Baron of Ribeira de Sabrosa
 Baron of Ribeirinha
 Baron of Ribeirinho
 Baron of Ribeiro
 Baron of Ribeiro Barbosa
 Baron of Rilvas
 Baron of Rio Ave
 Baron of Rio de Moinhos
 Baron of Rio Seco
 Baron of Rio Tinto
 Baron of Rio Torto
 Baron of Rio Zêzere
 Baron of Roches
 Baron of Rodrigues Mendes
 Baron of Roeda
 Baron of Rosenthal
 Baron of Roussado
 Baron of Ruffer
 Baron of Ruivoz
 Baron of Sá da Bandeira
 Baron of Saavedra
 Baron of Sabroso
 Baron of Salgado Zenha
 Baron of Salgueiro
 Baron of Salvaterra de Magos
 Baron of Sameiro
 Baron of Samões
 Baron of Samora Correia
 Baron of Samuel Vahl
 Baron of Sande
 Baron of Sandeman
 Baron of Sanhoane
 Baron of Santa Ana Nery
 Baron of Santa Bárbara
 Baron of Santa Cândida
 Baron of Santa Comba Dão
 Baron of Santa Cruz
 Baron of Santa Engrácia
 Baron of Santa Leocádia
 Baron of Santa Quitéria
 Baron of Santana
 Baron of Santiago de Lordelo
 Baron of Santo Amaro
 Baron of Santo Ambrósio
 Baron of Santo António
 Baron of Santos
 Baron of Santos Abreu
 Baron of São Clemente
 Baron of São Cosme
 Baron of São Dinis
 Baron of São Domingos
 Baron of São Francisco
 Baron of São George
 Baron of São Geraldo
 Baron of Sâo Januário
 Baron of Sâo Jerónimo de Real
 Baron of São João de Areias
 Baron of São João de Canelas
 Baron of São João de Loureiro
 Baron of São João Marcos
 Baron of São Joaquim
 Baron of São Jorge
 Baron of São José
 Baron of São José de Porto Alegre
 Baron of São Lázaro
 Baron of São Leonardo
 Baron of São Lourenço
 Baron of São Marcos
 Baron of São Martinho de Dume
 Baron of São Miguel
 Baron of São Miguel dos Campos
 Baron of São Nicolau
 Baron of São Pedro
 Baron of São Pedro do Rego da Murta
 Baron of São Raimundo
 Baron of São Roque
 Baron of São Salvador de Campos de Goitacazes
 Baron of São Simão
 Baron of São Torquato
 Baron of Sarmento
 Baron of Schweitzer
 Baron of Seisal
 Baron of Seixas
 Baron of Seixo
 Baron of Sena Fernandes
 Baron of Sendal
 Baron of Sernache
 Baron of Serra da Estrela
 Baron of Setúbal
 Baron of Silva
 Baron of Silva Gameiro
 Baron of Silva Nunes
 Baron of Silveira
 Barão of Silveiras
 Baron of Sobral
 Baron of Socorro
 Baron of Sousa
 Baron of Sousa Deiró
 Baron of Sousa Lajes
 Baron of Sousa Mesquita
 Baron of Soutelinho
 Baron of Soutelo
 Baron of Souto do Rio
 Baron of Stern
 Baron of Stockler
 Baron of Tavarede
 Baron of Tavares Leite
 Baron of Teixeira
 Baron of Teixoso
 Baron of Telheiras
 Baron of Tojal
 Baron of Tondela
 Baron of Torre
 Baron of Torre de Moncorvo
 Baron of Torre de Pero Palha
 Baron of Torre de Vila Cova da Lixa
 Baron of Trovisqueira
 Baron of Urgueira
 Baron of Uzel
 Baron of Valado
 Baron of Vale
 Baron of Vale da Mata
 Baron of Vale da Rica
 Baron of Vale de Estêvão
 Baron of Vale Formoso
 Baron of Valongo
 Baron of Vargem da Ordem
 Baron of Várzea do Douro
 Baron of Vascões
 Baron of Vasconcelos
 Baron of Venda da Cruz
 Baron of Verberckmoes
 Baron of Viamonte da Boa Vista
 Baron of Vila Cova
 Baron of Vila da Praia
 Baron of Vila Franca da Restauração
 Baron of Vila Franca de Xira
 Baron of Vila Gião
 Baron of Vila Nova da Rainha
 Baron of Vila Nova de Foz Coa
 Baron of Vila Nova de Gaia
 Baron of Vila Nova de Ourém
 Baron of Vila Nova do Minho
 Baron of Vila Pouca
 Baron of Vila Pouca de Aguiar
 Baron of Vila Seca
 Baron of Vila Verde
 Baron of Vilalva Guimarães
 Baron of Vilar
 Baron of Vilar Torpim
 Baron of Vinhais
 Baron of Welten
 Baron of Wendel
 Baron of Wildik
 Baron of Zambujal

See also
 Portuguese nobility
 List of dukedoms in Portugal
 List of marquesses in Portugal
 List of countships in Portugal
 List of viscountcies in Portugal

External links
Portuguese Aristocracy Titles in a Portuguese Genealogical site - Barons
Portuguese Aristocracy Titles in a Portuguese Genealogical site - Baronesses

Portugal
 
Barons